James Edward Flynn (21 March 1871 – 24 August 1955) was an Australian rules footballer who played with Geelong and Carlton in the Victorian Football League (VFL).

A ruckman, after two brief VFA stints, the Benalla-born Flynn started his career in earnest in 1897 where he was part of Geelong's inaugural VFL side. Flynn stayed with the club until the end of the 1902 season when he crossed to Carlton. He was made Carlton captain in 1905, and in 1906 led them to the premiership, defeating Fitzroy in the Grand Final. Due to business commitments in St James, running the local hotel (pub) which still operates today (37 kilometres north of Benalla), he retired from football; however, he returned for the 1907 finals series after captain Fred Elliott was suspended. Flynn's captaincy was sought after and he led them to another premiership. 

In 1908, Flynn did not play a game during the home-and-away season but was again used by Carlton in the finals, this time under the captaincy of Elliott, and was a member of a premiership side for the third successive year. He played his last match in Collingwood's semifinal of 1910 after three players had been dropped, accused of tanking in Carlton's upset Round 18 loss to St Kilda. As of 2021, he is the oldest player to play in a final.

Flynn was captain of the St. James Socialables FC that defeated St. James FC in the 1910 Dookie Football Association premiership. He was a member of the 1913 St. James FC premiership that defeated Yarrawonga in the Yarrawonga and Border Football Association.

Flynn is buried at Lake Rowan, east of St James, beside his wife and 10-year-old daughter Annastasia.

References

External links

Blueseum profile
The Grand Old Warrior
Let's Remember Jim Flynn. Wangaratta Chronicle

1871 births
1955 deaths
Australian rules footballers from Victoria (Australia)
Australian Rules footballers: place kick exponents
Geelong Football Club players
Carlton Football Club players
Carlton Football Club Premiership players
Three-time VFL/AFL Premiership players